Global Africa Aviation was a cargo airline based in Harare, Zimbabwe. It operated both scheduled and chartered cargo services using three MD-11 Freighters.

History

The airline was founded in 2014 and was intended to be the successor to Avient Aviation. It originally launched feeder routes within Africa before expanding to cities in Europe. It ceased operations on January 19, 2019.

Global Africa Aviation was developing passenger operations at the time is folded in 2019. The airline had the capacity to offer charter passenger flights but also wanted to expand to scheduled passenger operations.

See also
Avient Aviation
List of defunct airlines of Zimbabwe

References

External links

Airlines established in 2014
Cargo airlines of Zimbabwe